Vice Admiral Carl Holger Holter Henning (30 July 1905 – 4 February 1981) was a Swedish Navy officer. Henning served as Chief of the Military Office of the Ministry of Defence from 1961 to 1970.

Early life
Henning was born on 30 July 1905 in Härnösand Parish, Sweden, the son of Carl Henning and his wife Caroline Holter-Hedström. He passed studentexamen in Stockholm in 1924.

Career
Henning was commissioned as an officer in the Swedish Navy in 1927 with the rank of fänrik and then served aboard different coastal defence ships. He studied at the Royal Swedish Naval Staff College from 1933 to 1935 and served in the Naval Staff from 1935 to 1936, 1938 to 1939 and from 1942 to 1944. Henning was promoted to lieutenant commander in 1944 and then served as a teacher at the Royal Swedish Naval Staff College from 1946 to 1947.

In 1949, Henning was promoted to commander and he served as head of the Operations Department in the Naval Staff from 1949 to 1952. From January to March 1953, Henning captained HSwMS Gotland on a trip to Dakar in West Africa. He was promoted to captain in 1953 and served as head of Section II in the Defence Staff from 1953 to 1960. In 1960, Henning was promoted to rear admiral and he served as Acting Chief of the Military Office of the Ministry of Defence from 1960 to 1961 and then as Chief of the same from 1961 to 1970 when he retired and was at the same time promoted to vice admiral.

Henning became ADC to Crown Prince Gustaf Adolf in 1943 and served him until he became king Gustaf VI Adolf in 1953. He then served the king as senior ADC from 1953 to 1973. He was an expert in the 1941 Defense Inquiry and in the 1945 Defense Committee.

Personal life
In 1931, Henning married Dagmar Örnberg (1910–2000), the daughter of Major General Arthur Örnberg (1883–1967) and Carmen Hagander (1888–1982). He was the father of Birgitta (born 1933), Catharina (born 1936) and Per (born 1942).

Death
Henning died on 4 February 1981 in Oscar Parish in Stockholm. The funeral was held on 12 February 1981 in Hedvig Eleonora Church in Stockholm. He was interred at Galärvarvskyrkogården in Stockholm on 27 April 1981.

Dates of rank
1927 – Acting sub-lieutenant
19?? – Sub-lieutenant
19?? – Lieutenant
1944 – Lieutenant commander
1949 – Commander
1953 – Captain
1960 – Rear admiral
1970 – Vice admiral

Awards and decorations

Swedish
   King Gustaf V's Jubilee Commemorative Medal (1948)
   Commander Grand Cross of the Order of the Sword (6 June 1969)
   Commander 1st Class of the Order of the Sword (6 June 1961)
   Knight of the Order of Vasa (1942)

Foreign
   Commander with Star of the Order of St. Olav (1 July 1961)
   Commander of the Order of the White Rose of Finland
   Commander of the Legion of Honour
   Officer of the Order of Orange-Nassau with Swords

Honours
Member of the Royal Swedish Society of Naval Sciences (1943; honorary member in 1960)
Member of the Royal Swedish Academy of War Sciences (1955)

References

1905 births
1981 deaths
Swedish Navy vice admirals
People from Härnösand
Members of the Royal Swedish Society of Naval Sciences
Members of the Royal Swedish Academy of War Sciences
Commanders Grand Cross of the Order of the Sword
Knights of the Order of Vasa
Burials at Galärvarvskyrkogården